ZESCO (acronym for Zambia Electricity Supply Corporation Limited) is a state-owned power company in Zambia. It is Zambia's largest power company producing about 80% of the electricity consumed in the country.  ZESCO represents Zambia in the Southern African Power Pool.

Operations
The company operates nine hydropower stations with a combined capacity of 2,217.5 MW and eight small thermal power plants with a combined capacity of 11.3 MW resulting in a total installed capacity of 2,228.8 MW.

The company also owns and operates power distribution and transmission lines of 9,975 km.

ZESCO has formed power purchase agreements with private companies that own power plants in Zambia. It purchases the power produced and feeds is directly into the national grid. GL Africa Energy provides the national grid through ZESCO with over 105 MW of power under this agreement.

ZESCO owns 40% shares in EL Sewedy Electric Zambia Limited.

In June 2022, ZESCO signed a 13-year Bulk Supply Agreement (BSA) with Copperbelt Energy Corporation (CEC) Plc. The power supply limit under the BSA was set at 380MW. ZESCO projects that they will earn an estimated US$150.0 million per annum from the agreement. These earnings are expected to translate into an estimated US$2.0 billion over the lifetime of the BSA.

In July 2022, at the 94th Agricultural and Commercial Show in Lusaka, the managing director of the National Utility ZESCO, Victor Mapani announced that the company plans to deploy Electric Vehicle (EV) charging stations across the country in an effort to accelerate and promote the transition to EVs and enhance carbon emission reduction.

Power stations

Kafue Gorge Lower, 750 MW
Kafue Gorge Upper, 990 MW
Kariba North Bank, 720 MW
Kariba North Bank Extension, 360 MW
Victoria Falls, 108 MW
 Itezhi-Tezhi Dam, 120 MW
Maamba Collieries Thermal Power Station, 300 MW

Limitations
The national grid in Zambia only extends to some parts of the country.  For example, it ends  from the Ikelenge area around Kalene Hill in the extreme northwest, and as of 2008, ZESCO had no plans to provide power to this remote area. In response, some small-scale private operations have been established such as the Zengamina 700 KW hydroelectric generator.  The Energy Regulation Board is encouraging private investment in hydroelectric power generation in view of the power deficit.

See also 

 Economy of Zambia
 List of Zambian Companies

References

Notes

External links
ZESCO Official website

Electric power companies of Zambia
Non-renewable resource companies established in 1970
1970 establishments in Zambia